Rhys MacArthur McKenna (born 17 August 2004) is an Australian cricketer who plays as a right-arm fast-medium bowler and right-handed batter for Victoria in the Women's National Cricket League (WNCL) and Melbourne Stars in the Women's Big Bash League (WBBL). She made her professional debut in the first match of the 2021–22 WBBL for the Stars against Sydney Sixers, bowling one over for nine runs and taking the wicket of Ellyse Perry. She plays club cricket for Prahran.

International career
In December 2022, McKenna was selected in the Australia Under-19 squad for the 2023 ICC Under-19 Women's T20 World Cup.

References

External links

2004 births
Living people
People from Benoni
Australian women cricketers
Melbourne Stars (WBBL) cricketers
Victoria women cricketers